31st parallel may refer to:

31st parallel north, a circle of latitude in the Northern Hemisphere
31st parallel south, a circle of latitude in the Southern Hemisphere